Jaycees Field is a baseball venue in Nacogdoches, Texas, United States.  It is home to the Stephen F. Austin Lumberjacks baseball team of the NCAA Division I Southland Conference.  The field has a capacity of 1,000 spectators.

2009 renovations 
Prior to the 2009 season, the field underwent extensive renovations.  Additions included 148 chairbacked seats, 740 bleacher seats, a new press box, and an awning over premium seating areas.  The Lumberjacks opened the newly renovated facility on February 24, 2009, in a 7-5 loss to Houston.

See also 
 List of NCAA Division I baseball venues

References

External links 
2009 Renovation Photos from sfajacks.cstv.com

College baseball venues in the United States
Nacogdoches
Baseball venues in Texas
Stephen F. Austin Lumberjacks baseball